Horrie the Wog Dog is a 1945 book by Ion Idriess about the adventures of Horrie the Wog Dog, the Australian war mascot.

Idriess wrote the book based on the diaries of soldier Jim Moody.

References

1945 non-fiction books
Books by Ion Idriess
Australian non-fiction books
Diaries
Books about dogs
Angus & Robertson books